Yves de Wasseige (13 May 1926 – 2 August 2021) was a Belgian politician and economist.

Biography
De Wasseige served in the 10th Notre Dame de Fontgalland scout unit during World War II. He was a volunteer for the entire war and celebrated the Liberation of Belgium in 1944. He earned a degree in economics from the Catholic University of Leuven in 1951 and subsequently worked at a Hainaut-Sambre steel plant from 1958 to 1975.

Political engagement
In 1975, he left the steel plant to become chief of staff for Minister of Economic Affairs . After that, he served as a general delegate engineer for the General Commissariat for Atomic Energy from 1977 to 1979 before being elected Senator as a member of the Walloon Rally. The next year, he became secretary general of the party, replacing . Under his leadership, he resisted the party's tendencies to join DéFI in forming coalitions, advocating for its independence. He then co-founded the Rassemblement populaire wallon, which presented itself as a section of the Socialist Party. He was re-elected Senator in 1981, 1985, and 1987 before reaching the term limit set by the Socialist Party, and did not stand for re-election in 1991. He sat as a judge on the Constitutional Court from 1992 to 1994 before his resignation.

Economic engagement
The book still serves as the basis of the entrance examination of the Faculty of Economics at the Catholic University of Leuven. In 1978, he launched a restructuring plan for the steel industry in Wallonia.

Death
Yves de Wasseige died in Marcinelle on 2 August 2021 at the age of 95.

Publications
Comprendre l'économie politique
Effet de serre, nucléaire, fusion froide... (1989)
Sur le modèle social européen (2007)
L’ACROnique du nucléaire (2017)
En cours de route : souvenirs d'un militant

References

1926 births
2021 deaths
Belgian politicians
Belgian economists
Members of the Senate (Belgium)
Socialist Party (Belgium) politicians
Walloon Rally politicians
Catholic University of Leuven (1834–1968) alumni
People from Namur (province)
Belgian military personnel of World War II